A dry thunderstorm is a thunderstorm that produces thunder and lightning, but where most of its precipitation evaporates before reaching the ground. Dry lightning refers to lightning strikes occurring in this situation. Both are so common in the American West that they are sometimes used interchangeably.

Dry thunderstorms occur essentially in dry conditions, and their lightning is a major cause of wildfires. Because of that, the National Weather Service, and other agencies around the world, issue forecasts for its likelihood over large areas.

Where dry thunderstorms occur
Dry thunderstorms generally occur in deserts or places where the lower layers of the atmosphere usually contain little water vapor. Any precipitation that falls from elevated thunderstorms can be entirely evaporated as it falls through the lower dry layers. They are common during the summer months across much of western North America and other arid areas.  The shaft of precipitation that can be seen falling from a cloud without reaching the ground is called "virga".

A thunderstorm does not have to be completely dry to be considered dry; in many areas  is the threshold between a "wet" and "dry" thunderstorm.

Hazards
Dry thunderstorms are notable for two reasons: they are the most common natural origin of wildland fires, and they can produce strong gusty surface winds that can fan flames.

Dust storms

Strong winds often develop around dry thunderstorms as the evaporating precipitation causes excessive cooling of the air beneath the storm, which increases its density and thereby its weight relative to the surrounding air. This cool air then descends rapidly and fans out upon impacting the ground, an event often described as a dry microburst.  As the gusty winds expand outward from the storm, dry soil and sand are often picked up by the strong winds, creating dust and sand storms known as haboobs.

Fires

In areas where trees or other vegetation are present, there is little to no rain that can prevent the lightning from causing them to catch fire. Storm winds also fan the fire and firestorm, causing it to spread more quickly.

Pyrocumulonimbus are cumuliform clouds that can form over a large fire and that are particularly dry. When the higher levels of the atmosphere are cooler, and the surface is thus warmed to extreme temperatures due to a wildfire, volcano, or other event, convection will occur, and produce clouds and lightning. They are similar to any cumulus cloud but ingest extra particulates from the fire. This increases the voltage difference between the base and the top of the cloud, helping to produce lightning.

See also
 Heat lightning
 Lightning strike

References

Lightning
Light sources
Thunderstorm

fr:Orage sec